Frank Brazier (24 February 1934 – 10 May 2021) was a racing cyclist from Australia. He won a silver medal in the Road Race at the 1958 British Empire and Commonwealth Games at Cardiff. He competed in the men's 4000m Team Pursuit at the 1956 Summer Olympics and 1960 Summer Olympics, as well as the Team Time Trial and Road Race in 1960.

Brazier set the fastest time in the amateur Goulburn to Sydney Classic in 1962 run from Goulburn to Bankstown.

References

1934 births
2021 deaths
Australian male cyclists
Commonwealth Games silver medallists for Australia
Cyclists at the 1956 Summer Olympics
Cyclists at the 1958 British Empire and Commonwealth Games
Cyclists at the 1960 Summer Olympics
Olympic cyclists of Australia
Cyclists from Sydney
Commonwealth Games medallists in cycling
Australian track cyclists
20th-century Australian people
21st-century Australian people
Medallists at the 1958 British Empire and Commonwealth Games